Anandakuttan (1954 – 2016) was an Indian cinematographer who  worked predominantly in Malayalam cinema. He worked on over 150 films including His Highness Abdullah, Bharatham, Kamaladalam, Sadayam, Chronic Bachelor, Akashadoothu, Harikrishnans, Punjabi House and Aniyathipraavu. He died in 2016, at the age of 61.

Biography 
In 1954, Anandakuttan was born in vazhappilly, a small town near Changanassery, in Kottayam district of the south Indian state of Kerala, to a school teacher couple, Ramakrishnan Nair and Karthyayani Amma, as their only son among three children. He attended NSS School, Changanassery then moved to Chennai where he studied cinematography to join K. Ramachandra Babu as his assistant. His debut as an independent cinematographer was in 1977, with the movie, Manassoru Mayil, directed by P. Chandrakumar,  which started a career which covered over 150 movies, some of which were commercially and critically successful such as His Highness Abdullah, Bharatham, Kamaladalam, Sadayam, Chronic Bachelor, Akashadoothu, Harikrishnans, Punjabi House and Aniyathipraavu.

Anandakuttan was married to Geethamani and the couple had a son, Sreekumar and two daughters named Neelima and Karthika. He died from cardiac arrest on 14 February 2016, aged 61, at a private hospital in Kochi. He was cremated at Ravipuram crematorium.

Selected filmography

See also 
 Jayanan Vincent
 Madhu Ambat

References

Further reading

External links 
 
 
 
 

People from Kerala
People from Kottayam district
1954 births
2016 deaths
Malayalam film cinematographers
Tamil film cinematographers
Cinematographers from Kerala